Point Howard is a suburb on the eastern side of Wellington Harbour, in Lower Hutt, New Zealand.

Geography
Point Howard is a headland and bay situated near the swamp land around Waiwhetū and the estuary of Hutt River. It is the first of a series of bays on the eastern side of Wellington Harbour which wind their way to the Pencarrow headland. Māori legends and oral history record the hills in this area being clad in rare New Zealand beech forest which reached down to the shoreline.

Pre-European settlement 
Māori were first associated with the Eastern Bays around 1400. The Wellington area was occupied by Ngati Tara around 800 years ago and they were in turn supplanted by Ngāti Ira and their Rangitāne allies connected to the Ngati Kahungunu whose lands stretched into Wairarapa and Hawke's Bay. Between 1820 and 1840 they competed for control of the land with Ngāti Mutunga and Ngāti Toa from North Taranaki and after losing several battles the Ngāti Toa supported the iwi of Ngāti Tama and Ngāti Rangatahi in their occupation of lands around the Hutt Valley. By 1840 Ngati Toa Rangitira was the dominant iwi in the Wellington region. During this period the Eastern Bays were sparsely inhabited and primarily used as fishing grounds. The major Māori pā in the area was at Waiwhetu and land access to the eastern bays was by a steep track which ran up the long sloping ridge named Ngaumatau ('bite of the fishhook') by Ngati Ira. Te Atiawa chief Puakawa was killed in his garden at Ngaumatau shortly after the arrival of European settlers in the ship Tory in 1839.

European colonisation
 
The first Europeans to visit the bays were probably whalers and traders but European colonisation of Point Howard began with the 1826 survey of Wellington Harbour by Captain James Herd on board the ship Rosanna. This was followed by Colonel William Wakefield and the New Zealand Company's choice of the harbour for their first settlement and the arrival of the first settlers in 1839, on board the ship Tory. Captain Chaffers named the headland next to Lowry Bay, Point Howard, after Philip Howard, a member of the New Zealand Committee Association. Point Howard was originally part of Lowry Bay but remained undeveloped by Europeans for most of the nineteenth century. The Wairarapa Earthquake of 1855 was a significant event as it saw the land around the estuary uplift by nearly two metres to create land access along the base of Point Howard and was the beginning of road access to the southern bays.

Hugh Sinclair of Wainuiomata, owned much of the land around Point Howard, and in 1877 he laid out plans for a subdivision which included multiple access roads. Few sections were sold in the initial offer and the development was abandoned. By 1891, the land was still part of Lowry Bay and owned by the wealthy lawyer Dillon Bell. In 1905 legal requirements of Bell's family trust forced the subdivision of his land. The Lowry Bay Estate Company was formed to subdivide the northern section which included current Point Howard. Thirty-six subscribers brought 1000-pound shares to qualify for a ballot for the prime sections but it was 1920s before all the sections were sold. By 1938 there were 29 houses on the whole estate.

In 1907 the Hutt County Council began work on widening and constructing a properly formed road around the Eastern Bays and after the Second World War, better roads and cars increased its popularity as a picnic destination and home for wealthy Wellingtonians. The Hutt Council erected a bathing shelter across from Point Howard beach in 1926.

Industrial expansion
An expansion of industrial sites at Seaview on the northern approach to Point Howard in the 1920s led to major developments for the suburb. After Seaview was identified as a site for the storage of oil the Texas Oil Company (Texaco and later Caltex) bought five acres in 1929 and built oil storage tanks. In the same year the Harbour Board started work on the construction of a new oil wharf at Point Howard. The wharf was completed in March 1930 and while limited numbers of tankers used the wharf initially the expansion of related industries in Sea View saw more demand for use of the wharf. In 1930, the Vacuum Oil Company completed their major works on their petroleum and kerosene works on Sea View road and their two 750,000 gallon petroleum tanks were connected by an 8-inch pipeline with the Point Howard Wharf. In 1933 the wharf pilings were joined to extend the width of the wharf to cater with demand. In February 1934, the largest oil tanker to visit New Zealand, Texas Company's Australia, berthed at Point Howard wharf with her load of two million gallons of petroleum. 
Up until the 1930s the eastern bays were reliant on rainwater or access to a stream but in January 1932 work began on the area's water and sewage infrastructure. As this coincided with the depression years men on relief wages were employed to excavate a site at the top of Point Howard for a new reservoir to supply the Eastern Bays with water.

References

Further reading
Petone's first hundred years : a historical record of Petone's progress from 1840 to 1940, compiled by a committee of citizens on which the borough was represented by councillors J.C. Burns, J.R. Gaynor and A.M. Macfarlane. Wellington, N.Z. : Published for the Petone Borough Council by Messrs. L.T. Watkins, 1940
Once upon a village : a history of Lower Hutt, 1819–1965, David P. Millar, New Zealand University Press for Lower Hutt City Corporation, 1972.
Lower Hutt : past and present : a centennial and jubilee publication, [compiled and verified by William Toomath and Lance Hall, Lower Hutt Borough Council, 1941.

External links
Narrative of a residence in various parts of New Zealand : together with a description of the present state of the company's settlements, Charles Heaphy. State Library of New South Wales, DSM/ 987

Suburbs of Lower Hutt